The 2010 Tour of Turkey was the 46th edition of professional road bicycle racing Tour of Turkey.

Stages

Stage 1: 11 April 2010: İstanbul (prologue),  5.8 km

Stage 2: 12 April 2010: Kuşadası to Turgutreis, 181 km

Stage 3: 13 April 2010: Bodrum to Marmaris, 166 km

Stage 4: 14 April 2010: Marmaris to Pamukkale, 209 km

Stage 5: 15 April 2010: Denizli to Fethiye, 221 km

Stage 6: 16 April 2010: Fethiye to Finike, 194 km

Stage 7: 17 April 2010: Finike to Antalya, 114 km

Stage 8: 18 April 2010: Antalya to Alanya, 166 km

General classification

External links

Tour of Turkey
Tour of Turkey
Presidential Cycling Tour of Turkey by year